The Selkirk Steelers are a Junior "A" ice hockey team from Selkirk, Manitoba, Canada.  They are members of the Manitoba Junior Hockey League, a part of the Canadian Junior Hockey League and Hockey Canada.

History

Junior "A" hockey in Selkirk dates back to at least 1918, the founding of the MJHL.  As one of the original members of the MJHL, the Selkirk Fishermen became the second Turnbull Cup, MJHL Champions by winning the 1920 playoffs.  The Fishermen were crowned Western Junior "A" Champions and given the Abbott Cup.  They moved on to the Memorial Cup for the national championship, but were defeated by the Toronto Canoe Club Paddlers.  The 1920 Selkirk Fishermen were inducted into the Manitoba Hockey Hall of Fame in the team category.

In 1967, the Steelers joined the new Central Manitoba Junior Hockey League. The Steelers won the CMJHL title in its first year, but lost to the MJHL champion St. James Canadians in the Turnbull Cup finals.  The CMJHL merged with the MJHL after only one year.

To date, the Steelers have won a total of ten MJHL Turnbull Cup Championships.  Three of these championship teams went on to win the Anavet Cup.  The 1973-74 season was the Steelers' most successful season. which saw them win the MJHL title and then defeat the Prince Albert Raiders 4-games-to-2 to win the Anavet Cup.  They went on to compete for the Abbott Cup against the Kelowna Buckaroos of the British Columbia Junior Hockey League and defeated them 4-games-to-3.  This advanced the Steelers to the national championship against the Smiths Falls Bears of the Central Junior A Hockey League for the Manitoba Centennial Cup, the National Junior "A" Championship.  The series went seven games, with the Steelers stealing Game 7 1-0 in overtime to clinch their first and, so far, only national title.  The 1974 Selkirk Steelers were inducted into the Manitoba Hockey Hall of Fame in the team category.

The Steelers last captured the MJHL championship in 2006-07.  The Steelers defeated the Humboldt Broncos of the Saskatchewan Junior Hockey League four games to three for the Anavet Cup and advanced to the 2007 Royal Bank Cup, but were unable to advance past the round robin.

List of championships

Season-by-season record
Note: GP = Games Played, W = Wins, L = Losses, T = Ties, OTL = Overtime Losses, GF = Goals for, GA = Goals against

Playoffs
1971 Lost Semi-final
Selkirk Steelers defeated Portage Terriers 4-games-to-2
Kenora Muskies defeated Selkirk Steelers 4-games-to-1
1972 Lost Quarter-final
Dauphin Kings defeated Selkirk Steelers 4-games-to-none
1973 Lost Quarter-final
Kenora Muskies defeated Selkirk Steelers 4-games-to-2
1974 Won League, Won Anavet Cup, Won Abbott Cup, Won 1974 Centennial Cup
Selkirk Steelers defeated Portage Terriers 4-games-to-3
Selkirk Steelers defeated West Kildonan North Stars 4-games-to-1 MJHL CHAMPIONS
Selkirk Steelers defeated Prince Albert Raiders (SJHL) 4-games-to-2 ANAVET CUP CHAMPIONS
Selkirk Steelers defeated Kelowna Buckaroos (BCJHL) 4-games-to-3 ABBOTT CUP CHAMPIONS
Selkirk Steelers defeated Smiths Falls Bears (CJHL) 4-games-to-3 CENTENNIAL CUP CHAMPIONS
1975 Won League, Won Anavet Cup, Lost Abbott Cup
Selkirk Steelers defeated Portage Terriers 4-games-to-1
Selkirk Steelers defeated West Kildonan North Stars 4-games-to-3 MJHL CHAMPIONS
Selkirk Steelers defeated Swift Current Broncos (SJHL) 4-games-to-none ANAVET CUP CHAMPIONS
Spruce Grove Mets defeated Selkirk Steelers (AJHL) 4-games-to-2
1976 Won League, Lost Anavet Cup
Selkirk Steelers defeated Dauphin Kings 4-games-to-1
Selkirk Steelers defeated Brandon Travellers 4-games-to-1
Selkirk Steelers defeated West Kildonan North Stars 4-games-to-none MJHL CHAMPIONS
Prince Albert Raiders (SJHL) defeated Selkirk Steelers 4-games-to-1
1977 Lost Quarter-final
Brandon Travellers defeated Selkirk Steelers 4-games-to-3
1978 Lost Semi-final
Selkirk Steelers defeated Portage Terriers 4-games-to-none
Dauphin Kings defeated Selkirk Steelers 4-games-to-3
1979 Won League, Lost Anavet Cup
Selkirk Steelers defeated Brandon Travellers 4-games-to-2
Selkirk Steelers defeated Portage Terriers 4-games-to-none
Selkirk Steelers defeated Kildonan North Stars 4-games-to-2 MJHL CHAMPIONS
Prince Albert Raiders defeated Selkirk Steelers 3-games-to-1 and a default
1980 Won League, Won Turnbull Cup, Lost Anavet Cup
Selkirk Steelers defeated Kenora Thistles 4-games-to-none
Selkirk Steelers defeated Dauphin Kings 4-games-to-1
Selkirk Steelers defeated Kildonan North Stars 4-games-to-none MJHL CHAMPIONS
Selkirk Steelers defeated Thompson King Miners (NJHL) 3-games-to-none TURNBULL CUP CHAMPIONS
Prince Albert Raiders (SJHL) defeated Selkirk Steelers 4-games-to-2
1981 Lost Final
Selkirk Steelers defeated Kildonan North Stars 4-games-to-none
Selkirk Steelers defeated Dauphin Kings 4-games-to-1
St. Boniface Saints defeated Selkirk Steelers 4-games-to-1
1982 Lost Semi-final
Selkirk Steelers defeated Portage Terriers 4-games-to-none
Dauphin Kings defeated Selkirk Steelers 4-games-to-none
1983 Lost Quarter-final
Winkler Flyers defeated Selkirk Steelers 4-games-to-3
1984 Won League, Won Turnbull Cup, Lost Anavet Cup
Selkirk Steelers defeated Winkler Flyers 4-games-to-1
Selkirk Steelers defeated Dauphin Kings 4-games-to-1
Selkirk Steelers defeated Kildonan North Stars 4-games-to-1 MJHL CHAMPIONS
Selkirk Steelers defeated Flin Flon Bombers (NJHL) 4-games-to-1 TURNBULL CUP CHAMPIONS
Weyburn Red Wings (SJHL) defeated Selkirk Steelers 4-games-to-2
1985 Won League, Won Turnbull Cup, Lost Anavet Cup
Selkirk Steelers defeated St. Boniface Saints 4-games-to-1
Selkirk Steelers defeated Winkler Flyers 4-games-to-1
Selkirk Steelers defeated Winnipeg South Blues 4-games-to-1 MJHL CHAMPIONS
Selkirk Steelers defeated Thompson King Miners (NJHL) 3-games-to-none TURNBULL CUP CHAMPIONS
Estevan Bruins (SJHL) defeated Selkirk Steelers 4-games-to-1
1986 Lost Final
Selkirk Steelers defeated Dauphin Kings 4-games-to-1
Selkirk Steelers defeated Winkler Flyers 4-games-to-2
Winnipeg South Blues defeated Selkirk Steelers 4-games-to-none
1987 Won League, Lost Anavet Cup
Selkirk Steelers defeated Winkler Flyers 4-games-to-2Selkirk Steelers defeated Dauphin Kings 4-games-to-3Selkirk Steelers defeated Winnipeg South Blues 4-games-to-3 MJHL CHAMPIONS
Humboldt Broncos (SJHL) defeated Selkirk Steelers 4-games-to-none1988 Lost Quarter-finalPortage Terriers defeated Selkirk Steelers 4-games-to-11989 Lost FinalSelkirk Steelers defeated Portage Terriers 4-games-to-3Selkirk Steelers defeated Dauphin Kings 4-games-to-1Winnipeg South Blues defeated Selkirk Steelers 4-games-to-none1990 Lost Quarter-finalDauphin Kings defeated Selkirk Steelers 4-games-to-11991 Lost Quarter-finalDauphin Kings defeated Selkirk Steelers
1992 Lost Quarter-finalWinkler Flyers defeated Selkirk Steelers
1993 Lost Quarter-finalSt. Boniface Saints defeated Selkirk Steelers 4-games-to-none1994 DNQ1995 DNQ1996 Lost Quarter-finalSt. James Canadians defeated Selkirk Steelers 4-games-to-31997 Lost Semi-finalSelkirk Steelers defeated St. Boniface Saints 4-games-to-3St. James Canadians defeated Selkirk Steelers 4-games-to-none1998 Lost Quarter-finalSt. James Canadians defeated Selkirk Steelers 4-games-to-21999 Lost Quarter-finalWinnipeg South Blues defeated Selkirk Steelers 4-games-to-12000 Lost Quarter-finalWinnipeg South Blues defeated Selkirk Steelers 4-games-to-22001 Lost Quarter-finalWinkler Flyers defeated Selkirk Steelers 4-games-to-12002 Lost Quarter-finalWinkler Flyers defeated Selkirk Steelers 4-games-to-12003 Lost Quarter-finalWinnipeg South Blues defeated Selkirk Steelers 4-games-to-22004 Won League, Lost Anavet CupSelkirk Steelers defeated Winnipeg South Blues 4-games-to-3Selkirk Steelers defeated Winnipeg Saints 4-games-to-2Selkirk Steelers defeated Portage Terriers MJHL CHAMPIONS
Kindersley Klippers (SJHL) defeated Selkirk Steelers 4-games-to-32005 Lost FinalSelkirk Steelers defeated Winnipeg Saints 4-games-to-1Selkirk Steelers defeated Winnipeg South Blues 4-games-to-3Portage Terriers defeated Selkirk Steelers 4-games-to-22006 Lost Semi-finalSelkirk Steelers defeated Winnipeg Saints 4-games-to-2Winnipeg South Blues defeated Selkirk Steelers 4-games-to-none2007 Won League, Won Anavet Cup, Lost in 2007 Royal Bank Cup round robinSelkirk Steelers defeated Winkler Flyers 4-games-to-1Selkirk Steelers defeated Winnipeg Saints 4-games-to-noneSelkirk Steelers defeated Dauphin Kings 4-games-to-1 MJHL CHAMPIONS
Selkirk Steelers defeated Humboldt Broncos (SJHL) 4-games-to-3 ANAVET CUP CHAMPIONS
Fifth and eliminated from 2007 Royal Bank Cup round robin (0-4)
2008 Lost Quarter-finalWinkler Flyers defeated Selkirk Steelers 4-games-to-12009 Lost FinalSelkirk Steelers defeated Winkler Flyers 4-games-to-2Selkirk Steelers defeated Winnipeg Saints 4-games-to-2Portage Terriers defeated Selkirk Steelers 4-games-to-12010 Lost Quarter-finalWinkler Flyers defeated Selkirk Steelers 4-games-to-22011 Lost FinalSelkirk Steelers defeated Winnipeg Saints 4-games-to-1Selkirk Steelers defeated Winkler Flyers 4-games-to-2Portage Terriers defeated Selkirk Steelers 4-games-to-12012 Lost Quarter-finalPortage Terriers defeated Selkirk Steelers 4-games-to-02013 DNQ2014 Lost Quarter-finalWinnipeg Blues defeated Selkirk Steelers 4-games-to-12015 Lost Quarter-finalSelkirk Steelers defeated OCN Blizzard 2-games-to-0Steinbach Pistons defeated Selkirk Steelers 4-games-to-02016 Lost Quarter-finalSelkirk Steelers defeated Dauphin Kings 2-games-to-0Portage Terriers defeated Selkirk Steelers 4-games-to-02017 Lost Quarter-finalPortage Terriers defeated Selkirk Steelers 4-games-to-22018 Lost Quarter-finalVirden Oil Capitals defeated Selkirk Steelers 4-games-to-12019 Lost Quarter-finalVirden Oil Capitals defeated Selkirk Steelers 4-games-to-22020 DNQ2021 Playoffs cancelled2022 Lost Quarter-finalSteinbach Pistons defeated Selkirk Steelers 4-games-to-1''

NHL alumni
Murray Anderson 
Joe Cooper
Gerry Hogue
Dale Krentz 
Keith McCambridge
Lyle Phair 
Johnny Sheppard 
Alex Shibicky 
Joe Thorsteinson
Nick Wasnie
Neil Wilkinson
Darren Helm
Andrew Murray
 Chuck Arnason
 Rob Martell (NHL Referee)

See also
List of ice hockey teams in Manitoba
Manitoba Junior Hockey League
Hockey Manitoba

References

External links
Steelers Official Webpage
1920 Selkirk Fishermen at Manitoba Hockey Hall of Fame
1974 Selkirk Steelers at Manitoba Hockey Hall of Fame

Manitoba Junior Hockey League teams
Sport in Selkirk, Manitoba
1966 establishments in Manitoba
Ice hockey clubs established in 1966